Melbern is a small unincorporated community in western Center Township, Williams County, Ohio, United States.  It is situated on County Road 9 south of County Road D.

History
A post office called Melbern opened in 1866, and remained in operation until it was discontinued in 1961. First called Kansas, the present name was adopted when the post office was established.

Geography
Melbern is located at  (41.467, -84.651).  The elevation is 850 feet. A populated place (Class Code U6), Melbern appears on the Edgerton U.S. Geological Survey Map. Williams County is in the Eastern time zone (GMT -5).

Education
School age children living in Melbern attend Edgerton Local Schools.

References

Unincorporated communities in Williams County, Ohio
Unincorporated communities in Ohio